Ställdalen is a locality situated in Ljusnarsberg Municipality, Örebro County, Sweden with 539 inhabitants in 2010. In January 1956 there was a rail accident there.

References 

Populated places in Örebro County
Populated places in Ljusnarsberg Municipality